Cherno (Russian "black") may refer to:

Cherno more (disambiguation), black sea
Cherno (album), by Finnish metal band KYPCK, 2008
Cherno Samba, footballer
Cherno Jallow, former Attorney General of the British Virgin Islands
Cherno Jah, record producer, see Neneh Cherry

See also
Chernozem